Syamsuar (born 8 June 1954) is an Indonesian politician who is the Governor of Riau. He has served in the post since 2019, and had previously served as Regent of Siak Regency between 2011 and 2019.

Early life
Syamsuar was born on 8 June 1954 in the village of Jumrah, today in Rimba Melintang district of Rokan Hilir Regency, Riau, as the second son of Wahi Abdullah and Rahimah. His father farmed rice and rubber. He entered elementary school in his home village, before moving to Bagansiapiapi for middle school and Bengkalis for his high school, graduating in 1972.

Career
After graduating from high school, he moved to Sawahlunto to work there at a coal mine. After three years, he moved to Bengkalis and became a contract worker for the local government. While in Bengkalis, he went to a government academy, being accepted as a civil servant in 1987 and later obtaining a bachelor's degree in 1990 from the University of North Sumatra. He rose up the ranks between 1987 and 1996, and he had been appointed district head of Siak by 1996 and then of West Tanjung Pinang in 2000. By 2001, he had become the deputy regent of Siak Regency. In 2006, he ran in the regency election as the regent candidate, but was defeated by incumbent Arwin AS. During this period, he obtained his masters degree from Riau University in 2005.

After the election loss, Syamsuar worked in the provincial government of Riau, becoming the secretary of the provincial election commission in 2008, provincial inspector in 2010, and then acting regent of Meranti Islands Regency. He took part in Siak regency's election again in 2011, this time winning with 38 percent of the votes (in a four-candidate race). He would be reelected in 2016 with 59.6% of votes.

Siak regent
In 2017, Syamsuar mandated the wearing on Thursdays of Tanjak, a traditional Malay headwear, for civil servants in order to popularize its use. He also worked with the Malaysian consulate in Pekanbaru for relationships in cultural and sports fields. The old city of Siak, the former capital of the Sultanate of Siak Sri Indrapura, was also designated a Cultural Property of Indonesia during his tenure. Siak was signed up to be a "green" regency, aimed at conservation of remaining peatland in the regency.

He formally resigned as regent on 4 February 2019, in order to take up his new office as governor.

Riau governor
Syamsuar took part in the 2018 Riau gubernatorial election with Edy Nasution as his running mate, winning the election with 38.2 percent of votes. He was sworn in on 20 February 2019.

References

Living people
1954 births
Governors of Riau
University of North Sumatra alumni
Golkar politicians
People from Riau
Indonesian civil servants
Regents of places in Riau
University of Riau alumni